Road to Life (translit. Pedagogicheskaya poema) is a 1955 Soviet drama film directed by Aleksei Maslyukov and Mechislava Mayevskaya and based on the book by Anton Makarenko. It was entered into the 1956 Cannes Film Festival.

Cast
 Vladimir Yemelyanov as Anton Semyonovich Makarenko
 Georgi Yumatov as Sasha Zadorov
 Mikhail Pokotilo as Kalina Ivanovich
 Yelena Litskanovich as Yekaterina Grigoryevna
 Nina Krachkovskaya as Lidia Petrovna
 Misha  Chernov  as  Toska  Solovyev
 Yuri Sarantsev as Grisha Burun 
  P. Grubnik as Mityagan
 Ya. Panichev  as Gud
  A. Chistik as Taranets
 Yulian Panich as Semyon Karabanov
  A. Susnin as Ivan Lapot
 K. Yevgenyev as Vetikovsky
 V. Zhinovyev  as Zhorka Volkov
  Ye. Zhinovyev as Galamenko

References

External links

1955 films
1950s Russian-language films
1955 drama films
Films based on works by Ukrainian writers
Soviet drama films